is a Japanese voice actress and singer from Tokyo, Japan. She was previously affiliated with the agency Mausu Promotion, but is currently affiliated with Aoni Production. Debuting as a voice actress in 2013, she played her first main role as Rin Kohana in the 2015 anime television series Seiyu's Life!. She, together with the other main cast members of Seiyu's Life, are also members of the music group Earphones. She is known for her roles as Yua Nakajima in Hinako Note, Yumina Urnea Belfast in In Another World with My Smartphone, and Silence Suzuka in Uma Musume Pretty Derby.

Biography
Kouno was born in Tokyo on February 22, 1994. She is the second of three sisters; her older sister Rina is a dancer. As a child, she was already fond of reading aloud during elementary school classes. She first became interested in voice acting from watching anime series. After learning that the characters Pikachu from Pokémon and Chopper from One Piece were voiced by the same person, Ikue Ōtani, Kouno began to aspire to pursuing a career in voice acting.

Upon entering high school, Kouno joined her school's voice acting club, where she studied the performances of voice actors. She also participated in other activities such as playing basketball. After her graduation, she enrolled in a training school operated by the Yoyogi Animation Academy. She completed her studies in 2014, and became affiliated with the Mausu Promotion agency the same year.

Kouno began her career playing minor roles in anime series such as Aikatsu!, Log Horizon, and Rail Wars!. She then played the roles of Utako Uta and Pakuko in Chikasugi Idol Akae-chan, which was also the first time she performed a song in an anime. The following year, she was cast in her first main role as Rin Kohana in the anime series Seiyu's Life!. She, together with her Seiyu's Life co-stars Rie Takahashi and Yuki Nagaku, formed the music group Earphones. She also became a member of the idol group Team Ohenro.

In 2017, Kouno played the roles of Yua Nakajima in Hinako Note, and Yumina Urnea Belfast in In Another World With My Smartphone. She was also announced to be voicing the character Silence Suzuka in the multimedia franchise Uma Musume Pretty Derby. In 2018, she played the role of Sat-chan in Mitsuboshi Colors, and she reprised the role of Silence Suzuka for the anime series of Uma Musume Pretty Derby.

On October 1, 2020, she transferred to Aoni Production.

On February 24, 2020, Kouno made her solo singer debut under Nippon Columbia with the release of her first single, "Yume Mitai, demo Yume janai" (夢みたい、でも夢じゃない).

On November 1, 2022, it was announced on Kouno's Twitter page that she had been diagnosed with adjustment disorder in mid-October, 2022. Due to this, her scheduled activities has been limited per advices from her agency, Aoni Production, in order to prioritize her current treatment.

Filmography

TV anime
2014
Aikatsu!, Girl
Chikasugi Idol Akae-chan, Utako Uta, Pakuko
Log Horizon 2, Shimai Momoiro (ep 7), Kurinon (eps 21, 24–25)
Ohenro: Hachihachi Aruki, Megumi
Rail Wars!, Kaori (ep 3), Nami Jōgasaki (ep 4)
Shōnen Hollywood -Holly Stage for 49-, Riko Yasuda

2015
Chivalry of a Failed Knight, Student, Girl
Food Wars!: Shokugeki no Soma, Service division girl D (ep 14)
Is the Order a Rabbit?, Commoner club member C (ep 10)
Mikagura School Suite, Friend
Overlord, Nemu Emmot, Vampire Bride (ep 10)
Prison School, Couple Woman (ep 3) 
Seiyu's Life!, Rin Kohana 
Show by Rock!!, Shibarin
The Fruit of Grisaia, Danny's sister
The Heroic Legend of Arslan, Merchant's daughter (ep 9)
Valkyrie Drive: Mermaid, E9
Your Lie in April, Female student

2016
Flip Flappers, Nyunyu
Phantasy Star Online 2 The Animation, Marika
Re:Zero − Starting Life in Another World, Petra Leyte 
Scorching Ping Pong Girls, Hanabi Tenka
Show by Rock!!#, Shibarin
The Disastrous Life of Saiki K., Maimai (ep 20)

2017
Akiba's Trip: The Animation, Niwaka Denkigai
Hinako Note, Yua Nakajima
In Another World with My Smartphone, Yumina Urnea Belfast

2018
Mitsuboshi Colors, Sat-chan
Slow Start, Sachi Tsubakimori
Uma Musume Pretty Derby, Silence Suzuka

2019
 Azur Lane, Siren Purifier
After School Dice Club, Aya Takayashiki
Cautious Hero: The Hero Is Overpowered but Overly Cautious, Nina
Granbelm, Claire Fugo
If It's for My Daughter, I'd Even Defeat a Demon Lord, Sylvia
No Guns Life, Scarlett Gosling
We Never Learn, Mizuki Yuiga

2020
By the Grace of the Gods, Miya
Digimon Adventure:, Mimi Tachikawa
Mewkledreamy, Nene
Re:Zero − Starting Life in Another World 2nd Season, Petra Leyte
Seton Academy: Join the Pack!, Shiho Ihara

2021
D_Cide Traumerei the Animation, Eri Ibusaki
Eden, Sara Grace
Scarlet Nexus, Tsugumi Nazar
Uma Musume Pretty Derby Season 2, Silence Suzuka

2022
Beast Tamer, Nina
Don't Hurt Me, My Healer!, Receptionist
In the Heart of Kunoichi Tsubaki, Hinagiku
Love Flops, Karin Istel
Raven of the Inner Palace, Jiujiu

2023
By the Grace of the Gods 2nd Season, Miya
In Another World with My Smartphone 2nd Season, Yumina Urnea Belfast
Onimai: I'm Now Your Sister!, Mahiro Oyama

Anime films
2013
Bayonetta: Bloody Fate 
Hinata no Aoshigure, Students

2015
Wake Up, Girls! Beyond the Bottom, Noa Morina

2016
Digimon Adventure tri.- Chapter 2: 
Determination
Digimon Adventure tri.- Chapter 3: Confession
Pop in Q

Video games

2014
Tokyo 7th Sisters, Miu Aihara 
Toys Drive, Parute Leonard

2015
Criminal Girls 2: Party Favors, Enri
Shirohime Quest, Uwajimajō
Zettai Geigeki Wars, Kikka
Fire Emblem Fates Midoriko/Midori
2016
Mary Skelter: Nightmares, Shirayukihime
Shironeko Project, Mari

2017
Alternative Girls, Chiho Onitsuka 
Blue Reflection: Sword of the Girl Who Dances in Illusions, Yuzuki Shijou
Dead or Alive Xtreme Venus Vacation, Patty
Yuki Yuna is a Hero: A Sparkling Flower, Hinata Uesato
Gangan Pixies, Bītan/Usamaeru
Samurai Warriors: Spirit of Sanada, Chacha
Kirara Fantasia, Lamp 

2018
Alice Gear Aegis, Mutsumi Koashi
Magia Record, Leila Ibuki 
Browndust, Elin
Grimms Echoes, Gretel

2019

 Azur Lane, Hatsuharu
Azur Lane Crosswave, Siren Purifier

Fire Emblem Three Houses, Kronya

KonoSuba: Fantastic Days, Melissa

2021
Uma Musume Pretty Derby, Silence Suzuka
Scarlet Nexus, Tsugumi Nazar
Fate/Grand Order, Fairy Knight Lancelot (Melusine)
Arknights, La Pluma
Alchemy Stars, Maggie
NEO: The World Ends with You, Coco Atarashi
Samurai Warriors 5, Mitsuki
Pokémon Masters EX, EvelynGranblue Fantasy, EnyoBlue Archive, Amau Ako

2022Xenoblade Chronicles 3, X

Live-action
 Anime Supremacy! (2022), Aoi Mureno

Dubbing
 All Saints Street, Lily

Drama CDsOnimai: I'm Now Your Sister!'' (2018), Mahiro Oyama

References

External links
  
 

1994 births
Living people
Anime singers
Aoni Production voice actors
Earphones (band) members
Japanese video game actresses
Japanese voice actresses
Mausu Promotion voice actors
Singers from Tokyo
Voice actresses from Tokyo
21st-century Japanese women singers
21st-century Japanese singers
Nippon Columbia artists